Jrarat is a village in the Kotayk Province of Armenia. It was incorporated in 1982 and is the center of the dairy industry.

Toponymy 
The village was previously known as Randamal.

References

External links 

Populated places in Kotayk Province
Yazidi populated places in Armenia